Pidigan, officially the Municipality of Pidigan, is a 5th class municipality in the province of Abra, Philippines. According to the 2020 census, it has a population of 12,475 people.

Geography

According to the Philippine Statistics Authority, the municipality has a land area of  constituting  of the  total area of Abra.

Barangays
Pidigan is politically subdivided into 15 barangays. These barangays are headed by elected officials: Barangay Captain, Barangay Council, whose members are called Barangay Councilors. All are elected every three years.

Climate

Demographics

In the 2020 census, Pidigan had a population of 12,475.

Economy

Government
Pidigan, belonging to the lone congressional district of the province of Abra, is governed by a mayor designated as its local chief executive and by a municipal council as its legislative body in accordance with the Local Government Code. The mayor, vice mayor, and the councilors are elected directly by the people through an election which is being held every three years.

Elected officials

List of Cultural Properties of Pidigan

|}

References

External links

 [ Philippine Standard Geographic Code]
 Municipality of Pidigan

Municipalities of Abra (province)
Populated places on the Abra River